Amr Mohamed Eid El Solia (born on 2 April 1990) is an Egyptian professional footballer who plays as a midfielder for Egyptian League club Al Ahly and Egyptian national team. He featured in the 2021 AFCON final match against Senegal.

Career
In July 2014, El Solia was linked with a move to Norwegian Tippeligaen side Stabæk, managed by former Egypt manager Bob Bradley, but this move never came to fruition.

El Solia is the first player to score in three CAF Champions League Finals, after scoring in the 2018 CAF Champions League Final against Espérance de Tunis, 2020 CAF Champions League Final against Zamalek and in the 2021 CAF Champions League Final against Kaizer Chiefs.

Career Statistics 
''Last updated on 31 August 2020

With clubs

International

Honours
Al Ahly
 Egyptian Premier League: 2015–16, 2016–17, 2017–18, 2018–19, 2019–20
 Egypt Cup: 2016–17, 2019–20
 Egyptian Super Cup: 2017, 2018, 2021
 CAF Champions League: 2019–20, 2020-21
 CAF Super Cup: 2021

References

External links

 
 

1989 births
Living people
Egyptian footballers
Egypt international footballers
Ismaily SC players
Al-Shaab CSC players
Al Ahly SC players
UAE Pro League players
Egyptian Premier League players
Egyptian expatriate footballers
Expatriate footballers in the United Arab Emirates
People from Ismailia Governorate
Association football midfielders
2021 Africa Cup of Nations players